This is a list of seasons played by Harrow Borough Football Club in English football, from 1933 (when Roxonian F.C. were first formed) to the present day. It details the club's achievements in major competitions, and the top scorers for each season.

List

Key

P = Played
W = Games won
D = Games drawn
L = Games lost
F = Goals for
A = Goals against
Pts = Points
Pos = Final position

ILP = Isthmian League Premier Division
IL – 1 = Isthmian League Division One
IL – 2= Isthmian League Division Two
AL – 1 = Athenian League Div One
AL – 2 = Athenian League Div Two
SLSS = Spartan League Senior Section
SLPD = Spartan League Premier Division
SLCD = Spartan League Central Division
SLD2W = Spartan League Division Two West
HDLD1 = Harrow & District League Div One

MSC = Middlesex Senior Cup
MCC = Middlesex Charity Cup
HSC = Harrow Senior Cup
NWMIC = NW Middlesex Invitation Cup
GRMS = George Ruffell Memorial Shield

Pre = Preliminary Round
1Q = First Qualifying Round
2Q = Second Qualifying Round
3Q = Third Qualifying Round
4Q = Fourth Qualifying Round
R1 = Round 1
R2 = Round 2
R3 = Round 3
R4 = Round 4
R5 = Round 5
R6 = Round 6
SF = Semi-finals
QF = Quarter-finals
r = replayed

References

Sources

1945-1958  at Nonleaguetables.co.uk

Harrow Borough
Sport in the London Borough of Harrow
History of the London Borough of Harrow